Christoph Gruber (born 25 March 1976 in Schwaz) is an Austrian former alpine skier competing in all World Cup disciplines except slalom. In his World Cup debut, the super-G in Aspen, Colorado, on 27 November 1998, he finished in fourteenth position. On 21 December 2000, he won his first World Cup race, a giant slalom, in Bormio. He won the super-G in Garmisch-Partenkirchen three times.

World Cup victories

External links
 
 

1976 births
Austrian male alpine skiers
Alpine skiers at the 2002 Winter Olympics
Alpine skiers at the 2006 Winter Olympics
Olympic alpine skiers of Austria
People from Schwaz
Living people
Sportspeople from Tyrol (state)